County of Princess Anne is a former county in the British Colony of Virginia and the Commonwealth of Virginia in the United States, first incorporated in 1691.  The county was merged into the city of  Virginia Beach on January 1, 1963, ceasing to exist.

Historical population

Shires, Counties 

When Admiral Christopher Newport and the colonists of the Virginia Company arrived  in 1607, George Percy and his fellow Englishmen's "first landing" was at Cape Henry in what was to become Princess Anne County. They named the spot in honor of Henry Frederick Stuart, the elder of two surviving sons of King James I of England. A few days later, they travelled up the James River and established Jamestown. During the early 17th century, English settlers explored and began settling the areas adjacent to Hampton Roads. By 1610, the English colonists had established a permanent settlement in the Kecoughtan area of what was to become Elizabeth Cittie (sic) in 1619. Today a part of Hampton, it is the oldest known continuously occupied English settlement in North America.

Adam Thoroughgood was an early leader in the area which became Princess Anne County, settling along the Lynnhaven River. In 1634, the King of England directed the formation of eight shires (or counties) in the colony of Virginia. One of these was Elizabeth City Shire, which included land area on both sides of Hampton Roads.

New Norfolk County was formed in 1636 from Elizabeth City Shire. New Norfolk County included all the area in South Hampton Roads. Only a year later, New Norfolk was split roughly in half into Upper Norfolk County (most of which is now the present-day city of Suffolk) and Lower Norfolk County.  In 1691, Lower Norfolk was split roughly in half. The western half became Norfolk County, while the eastern half became Princess Anne County.  The latter was named for Anne Stuart prior to her accession to the throne in 1702.

The County of Princess Anne, Virginia was governed by a Board of Supervisors. Each Supervisor represented one of six Magisterial Districts.

Loyalist insurrection during the Revolutionary War
After the American colonies declared their independence in 1776, Loyalist opposition in various forms with different motives was present for the duration of the war.  In Princess Anne and Norfolk Counties, organized criminals took advantage of the sudden power vacuum created in part by the ineffectiveness of the newly formed local authorities. Josiah Philips, a native of Princess Anne County, led one such group. His group used intimidation, the county's rough, swampy terrain, and disaffected local sympathizers to rob, kill, and terrorize the area for several years.  
After Philips' capture and subsequent escape, a writ of attainder, perhaps drafted by Thomas Jefferson, was passed by the Virginia General Assembly naming Philips and his followers in an effort to end what it described as an "insurrection" in the counties.  Philips was tried and executed in June 1778.

Virginia Beach Resort (late 19th century – 1963)

Beginning in the late 19th century, the small resort area of Virginia Beach along the Atlantic Ocean at the north eastern portion of the county's vast expanse of shoreline grew, particularly after 1888 with the arrival of rail service and electricity. It was incorporated as a town in 1906 and became an independent city on January 1, 1963, but Princess Anne (Courthouse) remained the county seat.

However, in the mid 20th century, the western borders of Princess Anne County lost territory to annexation suits by Norfolk, Virginia which adjoined it after annexing all of the northern portion of Norfolk County.  A merger with the tiny city of Virginia Beach became seen as a way to prevent the independent City of Norfolk from annexing more (or potentially all) of Princess Anne County.

The original western border of Princess Anne County started in East Beach (present day Norfolk, Virginia) where 1st Bay Street meets the Chesapeake Bay. The county line traveled south down the inlet to Bi-County Road and continued between Moose Avenue and Buffalo Avenue, across East Little Creek Road, between the trailer park and Higby Street to meet North Military Highway. Follow North Military Highway south to Azalea Garden Road and Miller Store Road intersect. Travel southeast on Miller Store Road, to the end of Pritchard Street and follow the river under Interstate 64, to Cornick Road. From here simply follow the Broad Creek south.

Consolidation with City of Virginia Beach (1963) 

In 1963, after a successful referendum in both Virginia Beach and Princess Anne County, and with the approval of the Virginia General Assembly, Virginia Beach and Princess Anne County merged to form the present-day independent city of Virginia Beach. About the same time, Norfolk County merged with the small independent City of South Norfolk.  The independent city that resulted from that merger, Chesapeake, became Virginia Beach's new neighbor to the southwest.

Most of the area formerly in the County of Princess Anne when it was formed in 1691 is now located within the independent City of Virginia Beach. The only exceptions are some territory of the northwestern portion which became part of the City of Norfolk through annexation and a land swap agreement between the two cities in 1988.

Administrative divisions and sub-divisions

Magisterial District of Bayside
 Aragona, Virginia
 Bay Shore, Virginia
 Broad Creek, Virginia
 Davis Corner, Virginia
 Diamond Springs, Virginia
 East Beach, Virginia
 Little Creek, Virginia
 Lynnhaven
 Ocean Park, Virginia
 Pembroke Manor, Virginia
 Thalia

Magisterial District of Black Water
 Black Water, Virginia
 North Landing, Virginia
 Vine, Virginia

Magisterial District of Kempsville
 Bonney, Virginia
 Fairfield Manor, Virginia
 Kempsville
 Newtown
 Tallwood Manor, Virginia
 Wood Stock, Virginia
 Salem, Virginia Beach

Magisterial District of Lynnhaven
 Brock's Bridge, Virginia
 Cape Henry, Virginia
 Great Neck, Virginia
 Linkhorn Park, Virginia
 London Bridge
 Oceana
 Virginia Beach

Magisterial District of Pungo
 Back Bay
 Blossom Hill
 Capps, Virginia
 Creeds
 Land of Promise, Virginia
 Little Island
 Munden Point
 Pleasant Ridge
 Pungo
 Wash Woods

Magisterial District of Seaboard
 Dam Neck
 Land, Virginia (now Landstown)
 Mapleton (now Green Run)
 Princess Anne
 Sandbridge
 Seatack
 Sigma, Virginia

See also
History of Virginia Beach, Virginia
Cape Henry, Virginia
Seatack, Virginia
Wash Woods, Virginia
False Cape

References

Former counties of Virginia
History of Virginia Beach, Virginia
1691 establishments in Virginia
1963 disestablishments in Virginia